Teok is a small town situated in the Jorhat district of Assam, India. It is at a distance of about 20  kilometres from Jorhat city. The term 'Teok' is derived from the Tai languages. It literally means – ‘The place of milk and ghee’.

Transport
The National Highway 37 passes through Teok and connects it to other places of Assam. There is an Assam State Transport Corporation bus station. Jorhat Airport is the nearest airport to Teok. The town is well connected with nearby railway stations - Mariani Junction Railway Station, Selenghat Railway Station and Amguri Railway Station.

Education

Schools
 Teok Rajabari Higher Secondary School 
 Jyoti Vidyapith, Teok
 Teok High School
 Ben Garden High School, Teok
 Teok Girls' Higher Secondary School
 Teok Jatiya Vidyalaya
 Holy Flower Senior Secondary School, Teok
 Teok Rajabari Govt Junior Basic School
 Jogduar High School

Junior Colleges and College 
 Teok Junior College
 Renu Borah Memorial Academy, Teok
 Jnanpith Academy, Teok
 Chandra Kamal Bezbaruah College, Teok

Hospitals
 First Referral Unit (F.R.U.), Teok

Politics
Teok is part of Jorhat (Lok Sabha constituency) and AGP's Renupoma Rajkhowa is the current MLA of Teok (Vidhan Sabha constituency).

Notable People
 Binanda Chandra Barua, famous Assamese poet and author.

Notable Places to Visit Nearby
 Sri Sri Auniati Satra, Kaliapani (6 km away).
 Dhekiakhowa Bornamghar (12 km away).
 Lachit Borphukan's Maidam, tomb of the National Hero of Assam Lachit Borphukan (12 km away).
 Jhanjimukh, mouth of the river Jhanji in the Brahmaputra, a place full of natural beauty and a small picnic spot (12 km away).

References

Cities and towns in Jorhat district
Jorhat